Tibor Bodon (18 July 1931 – 26 March 2020) was a Hungarian football forward who played for Hungary. He also played for Salgótarjáni BTC.

Personal life
Bodon died on 26 March 2020 in Salgótarján at the age of 88.

References

External links
 
 
 

1931 births
2020 deaths
Hungarian footballers
Hungary international footballers
Association football forwards
People from Salgótarján
Salgótarjáni BTC footballers
Sportspeople from Nógrád County